HDB may refer to:

Organizations
 Housing and Development Bank, an Egyptian bank
Housing and Development Board, a statutory board of the Singapore government
 HDB/Cram and Ferguson, an architectural firm in Boston

Places
 Heidelberg railway station (rail station code: HDB), Heidelberg, Melbourne, Victoria, Australia
 Heidelberg Airport (ICAO airport code: EDIU; German airport code: HDB), Heidelberg, Germany; see List of airports by ICAO code: E

Computing
 HDB3, a digital telecommunications code
 D-subminiature high density B-sized connector
 HDB-15, a video connector
 , a device file for accessing computer storage
 Altibase HDB, a database engine made by Altibase, called HDB

Other uses
 The Himalayan Database, a Nepalese Himalayas data archive

See also